Santali can refer to:

 Santal people of India, Bangladesh, Nepal, Bhutan 
 Santali language, spoken by Santal
 Ol Chiki script, also known as Santali script

Language and nationality disambiguation pages